Wetlands is a 2013 German drama film directed by David Wnendt. It is based on the 2008 novel of the same name by Charlotte Roche and focuses on feminist issues, sexuality and coming of age. The film premiered in International competition at the 2013 Locarno International Film Festival on 11 August 2013.	

The film later premiered in-competition in the World Cinema Dramatic Competition at the 2014 Sundance Film Festival on 18 January 2014. After its premiere at the Sundance Film Festival, Strand Releasing acquired the US distribution rights for the film.

Plot
18-year-old Helen uses vegetables for masturbation and believes that body hygiene is overrated in our society. She provokes others by saying and doing things most people would not even dare to imagine.  She is sexually adventurous and visits a brothel to experience being with another woman. 
 
Helen's parents are divorced and she desperately wishes that they get back together. But her mother is depressive, hygiene-obsessed and mentally unstable, and her father is insensitive and seems not to take notice of what people around him think. She also has a quiet, younger brother whom she teases by taking his stuffed bear.

Helen feels alone and unloved in the world. Only her best friend Corinna makes her feel comfortable. Together they break many of society's taboos.

By shaving her anal hair too fast, she cuts herself badly and needs to go to hospital. There she plans to get her parents back together and charms her handsome nurse Robin, who is still suffering from a relationship with another nurse from two years before. That nurse does not  get along with Helen and is still infatuated with Robin. She makes Helen's life in the hospital more difficult, but Helen and Robin fall in love during her hospital stay.

Helen's behaviour is revealed to be related to a traumatic experience she had when she was eight years old, when she found her mother trying to kill herself and Helen's little brother using the gas from the oven. At the end of the film, Helen reflects on that trauma by saying that she finally talked to her little brother about that experience and that it was the hardest talk she ever had. In the end, as she is with Robin in his van leaving the hospital, she sees her parents finally meeting in the parking lot, and she asks Robin to continue driving.

Cast
Carla Juri as Helen Memel
Christoph Letkowski as Robin 
Marlen Kruse as Corinna
Meret Becker as Helen's mother
Axel Milberg as Helen's father
Edgar Selge as Dr Notz
Peri Baumeister as Schwester Valerie

Reception
Wetlands received mostly positive reviews from critics. Scott Foundas of Variety said in his review that "Director David Wnendt and breakout star Carla Juri leave no bodily orifice unexplored in this spiky, smartly packaged commercial enterprise." Boyd van Hoeij, in his review for The Hollywood Reporter, called the film "A poppy take on boundary-pushing sexual matters featuring a stellar breakthrough performance." Eric Kohn of Indiewire graded the film B+ and praised the performance of Carla Juri and film by saying that "Juri’s energetic performance – coupled with an equally jumpy soundtrack that includes Canned Heat and Peaches – manages to root the endeavor in fairly credible pathos, particularly with relation to her desire to see her parents reunite.  If we’re stuck with coming-of-age stories as a genre that storytellers must engage time and again, at least in the case of “Wetlands” the usual formula gets a much-needed jolt, while capably recognizing the aspects of the material that work on autopilot. The shock value only goes so far as a gimmick. "Wetlands" succeeds because, like Helen, it manages to sincerely embrace its taboos."

Accolades

References

External links
 Official website
 Official U.S. website
 
 

2013 films
2010s erotic drama films
German erotic drama films
German LGBT-related films
Films set in Berlin
2013 drama films
2013 LGBT-related films
2010s German-language films
Films directed by David Wnendt
2010s German films